In the Russian Orthodox tradition, Church on Blood (храм на крови) is a church commemorating the spot of the murder. There are four such churches:

Church of St. Demetrius on Blood in Uglich (17th century)commemorates the murder of Tsarevich Demetrius
Church of the Saviour on Blood in St. Petersburg (19th century)commemorates the murder of Alexander II of Russia
Church of All Saints, Yekaterinburg (21st century)commemorates the murder of Nicholas II of Russia and his family
Church of the New Martyrs and Confessors of the Russian Orthodox Church a.k.a. Lubyanka Church on Blood (21st century)commemorates the Gulag victims. It stands next to the infamous Lubyanka Building on the grounds of the Sretensky Monastery